Dreifuss is a surname. Notable people with the surname include:

Arthur Dreifuss (1908–1993), American film director
Fritz E. Dreifuss (1926–1997), American neurologist
Ruth Dreifuss (born 1940), Swiss politician

See also
Dryfoos (surname)
Dreyfus (disambiguation)
Dreyfuss
Claudia Dreifus, American journalist